Pavlos Grosdanis (born 3 April 2002) is a Greek professional footballer who plays as a midfielder for Super League 2 club Kavala.

Honours 
PAS Giannina

 Super League Greece 2: 2019–20

References

2002 births
Living people
Greek footballers
Super League Greece players
PAS Giannina F.C. players
Association football midfielders
Footballers from Florina